Keron Melique DeShields (born December 4, 1992) is an American professional basketball player for Hapoel Afula of the Israeli National League. He played college basketball for the University of Montana and Tennessee State University before playing professionally in Italy, Hungary, Israel, Greece and Lithuania. DeShields was named the Israeli National League Finals MVP in 2019.

Early life and college career
DeShields attended Vermont Academy in Saxtons River, Vermont, where he averaged a team-high 20 points and 5.0 assists per game, and was a first team all-conference selection as a senior.

Deshields played three years at Montana. He helped the Grizzlies to reach the Big Sky Tournament Championships and NCAA Tournament berths in 2012 and 2013.  On March 10, 2014, DeShields was named Honorable Mention All-Big Sky, alongside his teammate Jordan Gregory.

On May 30, 2014, Deshields was transferred from Montana to Tennessee State, but sat out first season at Tennessee State per NCAA Transfer rules.

In his senior year at Tennessee State, DeShields led the team and ranked seventh in the Ohio Valley Conference with 16.5 points per game and also averaged 3.3 rebounds and 3.0 assists in 32.8 minutes per game. DeShields was named First Team All-OVC, OVC All-Newcomer Team and NABC First Team All-District 19.

Professional career

2016–17 season
On July 16, 2016, DeShields started his professional career with Latina Basket of the Italian Serie A2 Basket, signing a one-year deal. On December 11, 2016, DeShields recorded a season-high 30 points, shooting 12-of-21 from the field, in a 93–90 win over Viola Reggio Calabria. In 30 games played for Latina, DeShields averaged 15.5 points, 4.7 rebounds, 3.8 assists and 1.1 steals per game.

2017–18 season
On September 11, 2017, DeShields signed a one-year deal with the Hungarian team Jászberényi KSE. On January 12, 2018, DeShields parted ways with Jászberényi to join Debreceni EAC. On February 6, 2018, he parted ways with Debreceni after appearing in four games.

On February 19, 2018, DeShields signed with the Israeli team Hapoel Afula for the rest of the Israeli National League season, as injury cover for Tre Simmons. On March 20, 2018, DeShields recorded a career-high 32 points, shooting 11-of-18 from the field, along with nine rebounds and eight assists in a 93–86 win over Maccabi Hod HaSharon.

On April 30, 2018, DeShields signed with the Greek team Rethymno Cretan Kings for the rest of the season, replacing Malcolm Armstead.

2018–19 season
On June 28, 2018, DeShields returned to Israel for a second stint, signing a two-year deal with Maccabi Haifa. On April 23, 2019, DeShields recorded a season-high 30 points, shooting 11-of-22 from the field, along with four rebounds and seven assists in an 85–82 playoff win over Maccabi Ra'anana. On May 24, 2019, DeShields led Haifa to win the 2019 Israeli National League Championship after averaging 18.2 points in four games played in the final series against Hapoel Galil Elyon. He was subsequently named the Finals MVP.

2019–20 season
On October 7, 2019, DeShields signed a one-year deal with Šiauliai of the Lithuanian Basketball League. He averaged 7.4 points and 2.9 assists per game.

On March 6, 2020, he has signed with Hapoel Afula of the Israeli National League.

2020–21 season
On July 19, 2020, DeShields signed with Ironi Ramat Gan in Israel.

2021–22 season
On September 22, 2021, DeShields signed with San Severo on the Serie A2 Basket. He subsequently joined Trotamundos B.B.C. of the Venezuelan league and averaged 20.8 points, 4.8 assists, 3.8 rebounds, and 1.2 steals per game. On January 5, 2022, DeShields signed with Hapoel Afula of the Israeli National League.

References

External links
 Montana Grizzlies bio
 Tennessee State Tigers bio
 RealGM profile

1992 births
Living people
Vermont Academy alumni
American expatriate basketball people in Greece
American expatriate basketball people in Hungary
American expatriate basketball people in Israel
American expatriate basketball people in Italy
American expatriate basketball people in Lithuania
American expatriate basketball people in Venezuela
American men's basketball players
Basketball players from Baltimore
BC Šiauliai players
Debreceni EAC (basketball) players
Hapoel Afula players
Jászberényi KSE players
Maccabi Haifa B.C. players
Montana Grizzlies basketball players
Point guards
Rethymno B.C. players
Shooting guards
Tennessee State Tigers basketball players